The Castle Conundrum is a Hardy Boys novel. It was first published in 2001.

The Hardys head to France to help in the construction of a center for children, thanks to Teen Village International, a worldwide, non-profit organization. But the Hardys soon realize that the castle next door is supposedly haunted. The Hardys, also, realize that someone is after the treasure hidden inside the castle. Knowing that, the Hardys try to figure out and stop this mysterious person before they get rid of the Hardys for good.

References

The Hardy Boys books
2001 American novels
2001 children's books
Novels set in France